MCV Bus and Coach is an Egyptian manufacturer of bus bodies founded in 2002 when Manufacturing Commercial Vehicles bought some of the design rights of defunct English bus builder Marshall Bus.

History

MCV's first deliveries were five Capital bodies on Dennis Darts for English operator Warrington Borough Transport in early 2003. However TransBus subsequently decided not to make the Dart chassis available to other bodybuilders resulting in the superseding MCV Stirling appearing on the MAN 14.220 chassis.

This was in turn succeeded by the MCV Evolution in 2005 that has been built on various chassis from Alexander Dennis, MAN, Mercedes-Benz, VDL and Volvo.

MCV has also built double deck bodies with the DD102, DD103 and EvoSeti. The latter has been purchased in sizeable numbers by London operators Go-Ahead London, Golden Tours and Tower Transit.

Current models
MCV EvoTor (2018–present)
MCV Evora (2018–present)
MCV EvoSeti (2015–present)

Former models
MCV Capital (2003)
MCV DD102 (2014)
MCV DD103 (2011–2014)
MCV Ego (2006–2007)
MCV Evolution (2003–2014)
MCV Stirling (2003–2005)  
MCV Evolution 2 (2011–2018)

References

External links

Bus manufacturers of Egypt
Egyptian companies established in 2002
Vehicle manufacturing companies established in 2002